Stonehenge is the second album by Ruins, released in 1990 through Shimmy Disc.

Track listing

Personnel 
Ruins
Kazuyoshi Kimoto – vocals, bass guitar, violin
Tatsuya Yoshida – vocals, drums, photography, design
Production and additional personnel
Ruins – production
Michael Dorf – assistant producer

References

External links 
 

1990 albums
Ruins (Japanese band) albums
Shimmy Disc albums